The J. Paul Getty Museum, commonly referred to as the Getty, is an art museum in Los Angeles, California housed on two campuses: the Getty Center and Getty Villa.

The Getty Center is located in the Brentwood neighborhood of Los Angeles and features pre-20th-century European paintings, drawings, illuminated manuscripts, sculpture, decorative arts, and photographs from the inception of photography through present day from all over the world. The original Getty museum, the Getty Villa, is located in the Pacific Palisades neighborhood of Los Angeles and displays art from Ancient Greece, Rome, and Etruria.

History 

In 1974, J. Paul Getty opened a museum in a re-creation of the Villa of the Papyri at Herculaneum on his property in Malibu, California. In 1982, the museum became the richest in the world when it inherited US$1.2 billion. In 1983, after an economic downturn in what was then West Germany, the Getty Museum acquired 144 illuminated medieval manuscripts from the financially struggling Ludwig Collection in Aachen; John Russell, writing in The New York Times, said of the collection, "One of the finest holdings of its kind ever assembled, it is quite certainly the most important that was in private hands." In 1997, the museum moved to its current location in the Brentwood neighborhood of Los Angeles; the Malibu museum, renamed the "Getty Villa", was renovated and reopened in 2006.

GettyGuide 

A suite of interactive multimedia tools called GettyGuide allows visitors to access information about exhibitions. Within the museum, the GettyGuide multimedia player provides commentary from curators and conservators on many works of art.

The controversies with Italy and Greece 
In the 1970s and 1980s, the curator, Jiří Frel, designed a tax manipulation scheme which expanded the museum collection of antiquities, essentially buying artifacts of dubious provenance, as well as a number of artifacts generally considered fakes, such as the Getty kouros. In 1984, Frel was demoted, and in 1986, he resigned.

The Getty is involved in a controversy regarding proper title to some of the artwork in its collection. The museum's previous curator of antiquities, Marion True (hired by Frel), was indicted in Italy in 2005 (along with famed dealer Robert E. Hecht) on criminal charges relating to trafficking in stolen antiquities. Similar charges have been addressed by the Greek authorities. The primary evidence in the case came from the 1995 raid of a Geneva, Switzerland, warehouse which had contained a fortune in stolen artifacts. Italian art dealer Giacomo Medici was arrested in 1997; his operation was thought to be "one of the largest and most sophisticated antiquities networks in the world, responsible for illegally digging up and spiriting away thousands of top-drawer pieces and passing them on to the most elite end of the international art market". In 2005 True was forced to tender her resignation by the Board of Trustees, which announced her early retirement. Italy allowed the statute of limitations of the charges filed against her to expire in October 2010.

In a letter to the J. Paul Getty Trust on December 18, 2006, True stated that she was being made to "carry the burden" for practices which were known, approved, and condoned by the Getty's board of directors. True is currently under investigation by Greek authorities over the acquisition of a 2,500-year-old funerary wreath, that was illegally excavated and smuggled outside of the country. The wreath, along with a 6th-century BC statue of a kore, have been returned to Greece and are currently exhibited at the Archaeological Museum of Thessaloniki. Additionally, a 2,400-year-old, black limestone stele and a marble votive relief dating from about 490 BC were also returned.

On November 20, 2006, the director of the museum, Michael Brand, announced that 26 disputed pieces were to be returned to Italy, but not the Victorious Youth, which is still claimed by the Italian authorities. In 2007, the Los Angeles J. Paul Getty Museum was forced to return 40 artifacts, including a 5th-century BC statue of the goddess Aphrodite, which was looted from Morgantina, an ancient Greek settlement in Sicily. The Getty Museum resisted the requests of the Italian government for nearly two decades, only to admit later that "there might be 'problems'" attached to the acquisition." In 2006, Italian senior cultural official Giuseppe Proietti said: "The negotiations haven't made a single step forward." Only after he suggested the Italian government "to take cultural sanctions against the Getty, suspending all cultural cooperation," did the J. Paul Getty Museum return the antiquities.

In another unrelated case in 1999, the Getty Museum had to hand over three antiquities to Italy after determining they were stolen. The objects included a Greek red-figure kylix from the 5th-century BC, signed by the painter Onesimos and the potter Euphronios as potter, looted from the Etruscan site of Cerveteri; a torso of the god Mithra from the 2nd-century AD, and the head of a youth by the Greek sculptor Polykleitos.

In 2016, the terracotta head of the Greek god Hades was returned to Sicily (Italy). The archaeological artifact was looted from Morgantina in the 1970s.  The Getty museum purchased the terracotta head of Hades in 1985 from the New York collector Maurice Tempelsman, who had purchased it from the London dealer Robin Symes. Getty records show the museum paid $530,000 for it. On December 21, 2016, the head of Hades was added to the collection of the archaeological museum of Aidone, where it joined the statue of Demeter, the mother of his consort Persephone. Sicilian archaeologists found a blue curl that was missing from Hades' beard, and so it proved the origin of the terracotta head.

Response during the COVID-19 pandemic 
Many museums turned to their existing social media presences to engage their audience online during the COVID-19 pandemic. Inspired by the Rijksmuseum in Amsterdam and Instagram accounts such as the Dutch Tussen Kunst & Quarantaine (“between art and quarantine”) and Covid Classics, the Getty sponsored the Getty Museum Challenge, inviting people to use everyday objects to recreate works of art and share their creations on social media, prompting thousands of submissions. The museum was among those singled out for particular praise by industry analysts for their successful social media content strategy during the shutdown, both for the challenge and for incorporating its works into the popular video game Animal Crossing.

Selected paintings collection highlights

Selected objects collection highlights

See also
 Getty Conservation Institute
 Getty Foundation
 Getty Research Institute

References

External links

Virtual tour of the J. Paul Getty Museum provided by Google Arts & Culture

 
Getty
Getty
Getty
Getty
Getty
J. Paul Getty Trust
Getty
Getty
Getty